Ardon ( or ) is the name of several inhabited localities in Russia.

Urban localities
Ardon, Republic of North Ossetia-Alania, a town in Ardonsky District of the Republic of North Ossetia-Alania

Rural localities
Ardon, Bryansk Oblast, a selo under the administrative jurisdiction of the town of oblast significance of Klintsy in Bryansk Oblast